is a former Japanese football player.

Club career
Shirasawa was born in Kobe on December 13, 1964. After graduating from high school, he joined Yanmar Diesel in 1983. He played 93 games until 1992. In 1993, he moved to Kyoto Purple Sanga and retired end of the season.

National team career
In 1988, Shirasawa was selected Japan national "B team" for 1988 Asian Cup. At this competition, he played 3 games. However, Japan Football Association don't count as Japan national team match because this Japan team was "B team" not "top team"

References

External links

1964 births
Living people
Association football people from Hyōgo Prefecture
Japanese footballers
Japan Soccer League players
Japan Football League (1992–1998) players
Cerezo Osaka players
Kyoto Sanga FC players
1988 AFC Asian Cup players
Association football midfielders